The Gaon Digital Chart of Gaon Music Chart is a chart that ranks the best-performing songs in South Korea. The data is collected by the Korea Music Content Association. It consists of a weekly chart, listed from Sunday to Saturday, a monthly chart, and a yearly chart. Below is a list of songs that topped the weekly, monthly, and yearly charts. The Digital Chart ranks songs according to their performance on the Gaon Download, Streaming and BGM charts.

Weekly charts

Monthly charts

References

External links
 Gaon Digital Chart 

2013 singles
Korea, South singles
2013 in South Korean music